A massacre is the deliberate slaughter of members of one group by one or more members of another more powerful group. A massacre may be indiscriminate or highly methodical in application. A massacre is a single event, though it may occur during the course of an extended military campaign or war. A massacre is separate from a battle (an event in which opposing sides fight), but may follow in its immediate aftermath, when one side has surrendered or lost the ability to fight, yet the victors persist in killing their opponents.

Massacres

See also
List of terrorist incidents in Pakistan since 2001
 Terrorist incidents in Pakistan in 2016
 2019 Ghotki riots
 2014 Larkana temple attack
 2009 Gojra riots

References

Pakistan
Murder in Pakistan
Massacres

Massacres